Radio Gorica is a radio station in Podgorica Montenegro, broadcasting at 93.3 MHz.  The name Gorica means small hill in Montenegrin and other Slavic languages.

References

Radio stations in Montenegro
Mass media in Podgorica